No One Else But Kenny is a studio album by clarinetist Kenny Davern that was recorded shortly before his death. Davern breaks from his dixieland style in favor of a more swinging sound.

Track listing 
Sugar (5:24)       
Moonglow (6:23)       
No One Else But You (4:59)       
DBR Drag (5:05)       
You're Lucky to Me (5:04)       
Joshua Fit the Battle of Jericho (5:17)       
Tishomingo Blues (4:38)       
All by Myself (5:40)       
Pretty Baby (Clarinet/Piano Duet) (5:49)       
(There Is) No Greater Love (7:00)       
Beale Street Blues (Piano Solo) (4:00)       
My Honey's Loving Arms (5:10)

Personnel
 Kenny Davern – clarinet
 David Boeddinghaus – piano
 Trevor Richards – drums

Reception

Jazz Times said while the drum performance was confusing, the collaboration between Kenny Davern and David Boeddinghaus was pleasant.

References

2006 albums
Kenny Davern albums
Sackville Records albums
Swing albums